Khull (Noor-abad) is a village in the Noor-abad constituency of Kulgam district of Jammu and Kashmir in India administered Kashmir.

The full name of Khull is Qasba Khull (Noorabad) and it is a tehsil of district Kulgam.

There are more than 19 schools 
 Govt Higher Secondary school Qasba khull noorabad 
 Hanfia Noorani public high school khull
Govt High School qasba khull
 Gousia Little angels school Qasba khull
 Govt Girls High school qasba khull
 Govt Middle school bungam khull
Govt Middle school Putpora bungam
 New Radiant Public School Qasba khull noorabad
 Green Valley School qasba khull noorabad
 Govt Middle School Ringth qasba khull noorabad
Govt Middle school gujar basti khull
Govt Middle school Baba pora 
Govt Middle school Lateef bagh khull

Two Sports Stadium is also located near Ardpora named as MANDLS Stadium qasba Khull noorabad and Ringat named Ringat qasba khull playground

There are So many well known Doctors Hailing from Village

Literacy rate is Very high than other villages

There is a bank Edb bank elaqui dehati bank qasba khull 

There is a Religion Institute namely Darul uloom Ishatul Quran wa Sunnah Ardpora, Qasba Khull Noorabad

There is a  Hospital
Sub district hospital qasba khull noorabad

If anyone edit this then they have certificate from JK police station d h pora

References

Villages in Kulgam district